Eco: East Africa is a video game developed by American studio Viridis and published by IVI Publishing for the PC.

Gameplay
Eco: East Africa is a game in which the player is a game warden who has been hired to revive a failing African game park.

Reception

Next Generation reviewed the PC version of the game, rating it two stars out of five, and stated that "Exploring your park is kind of entertaining, but only for a very short while.  Hey, once you've seen one pack of hyenas feasting on a carcass or an elephant loping across the screen, you've pretty much seen them all.  And you'll be way too tied down with administrative duties to do much sight-seeing anyway." Computer Game Reviews Tasos Kaiafas called the game "not very educational, interesting or fun."

Reviews
PC Gamer Vol. 2 No. 8 (1995 August)

References

1995 video games
Simulation video games
Video games developed in the United States
Video games set in Africa
Windows games
Windows-only games